Annika is a feminine given name. It is the Swedish pet form of Anna, similar to Anneke in the Netherlands. It is also common in Germany, Finland and Estonia, gaining popularity after 1969 from the character of that name in the Pippi Longstocking TV series and film.

 Annika Beck (born 1994), German tennis player
 Annika Bryn (born 1945), Swedish author and freelance journalist
 Annika Drazek (born 1995), German bobsledder and track and field athlete
 Annika Fredén (born 1978), Swedish handball player
 Annika Idström (1947-2011), Finnish writer
 Annika Kipp (born 1979), German television presenter
 Annika Kjærgaard (born 1971), Swedish singer
 Annika Langvad (born 1984), Danish cross mountain biker
 Annika Lemström (born 1964), Finnish sailor
 Annika Norlin (born 1977), Swedish pop artist and journalist
 Annika Mombauer (born 1967), British academic and historian
 Annika Reeder (born 1979), British artistic gymnast
 Annika Saarikko (born 1983), Finnish politician
 Annika Saarnak (born 1988), Estonian swimmer
 Annika Svahn (fl. 1714), Finnish dragoon
 Annika Sörenstam (born 1970), Swedish professional golfer
 Annika Tammela (1979–2001), Estonian footballer
 Annika Uvehall (born 1965), Swedish Olympic swimmer
 Annika Viilo (born 1965), Finnish orienteer

Arts and entertainment

Fictional characters

 Annika Hansen, a.k.a. Seven of Nine in Star Trek: Voyager series on television
 Annika Settergren, in Pippi Longstocking novel
 Princess Annika, in Barbie and the Magic of Pegasus
 Queens Annika and Neha, in The Dragon Prince
Annika Attwater, in You

Television 
 Annika, 1984 TV mini-series
 Annika, 2021 British TV series

See also
817 Annika, asteroid
Anika, spelling variant

Feminine given names
Swedish feminine given names
German feminine given names
Finnish feminine given names
Danish feminine given names
Estonian feminine given names
Dutch feminine given names